Simon Brooks (born 1971) is a Welsh academic and writer.

Academia and Government Adviser
He is currently an Associate Professor in the School of Management at Swansea University, an interdisciplinary scholar specialising in history, the history of ideas, multiculturalism, political theory and public policy. He is also a member of the University's Morgan Academy. 

Brooks has also been appointed as an advisor to the Welsh Government as a member of the Welsh Language Partnership Council, for which he published the report 'Second homes: Developing new policies in Wales' in 2021. Recommendations underpinned government policy in the area.

In 2020 he chaired the government committee established to review the impact of the COVID-19 pandemic in Wales on Welsh-speaking community groups. Once again, the Committee recommendations underpin government policy.

Author
Brooks is an independent author and is a former editor of the Welsh language current affairs magazine Barn (1996–2007), and between 1993 and 1996 was a founding co-editor of the Welsh language cultural magazine Tu Chwith. A collection of his journalism in Barn was published in 2009. Brooks is the General Editor of Dawn Dweud, the University of Wales Press series of intellectual biographies.

His book Pam Na Fu Cymru (2015; English version: Why Wales Never Was) was shortlisted for Wales Book of the Year award in the non-fiction category. The English edition was published in 2017. Jerry Hunter, Professor in the School of Welsh and Deputy Vice Chancellor at Bangor University, said of Why Wales Never Was, "This is a multi-layered study that tackles core questions about nationality, language and identity. It talks about the past with a view to the present and the future, in a challenging and exciting way." 

In 2005 O Dan Lygaid y Gestapo (Beneath the eyes of the Gestapo) was also shortlisted for the Wales Book of the Year award.

As a cultural historian, Brooks has published three monographs with the University of Wales Press. O Dan Lygaid y Gestapo (University of Wales Press; 2014) explored the influence of Enlightenment thought within 20th century Welsh-language culture. Pam na fu Cymru (University of Wales Press; 2015) proposed that the historical failure of Welsh nationalism was due to its dependence on a form of British liberalism which promoted Anglophone majoritarianism. Hanes Cymry (University of Wales Press;2021), the first history of ethnic diversity within Welsh-language culture, argued that the Welsh-language community has always been multi-ethnic.

In 2018, he published Adra, an autoethnographical account of a year supporting Porthmadog Football Club. Brooks was Chair of Porthmadog Town Council at the time, and the book has been described an account of life in a 'left behind' small town.

Language and politics
He is also a founding member of the Welsh language pressure group Cymuned, for whom he was a prominent media spokesman between 2001 and 2004, and whose central office he ran. In 2012 he was also one of the founders of Dyfodol i'r Iaith, a 'constitutional' lobbying group for the Welsh language, whose aim is to 'to influence the public policy and legislation to "promote and nurture" the language.'

Brooks belongs to a family that supports the Labour Party but is himself a Welsh Nationalist.

Bibliography 
Academic
 O Dan Lygaid y Gestapo: Yr Oleuedigaeth Gymraeg a Theori Lenyddol yng Nghymru (Beneath the eyes of the Gestapo:  The Welsh Enlightenment and Literature Theory in Wales) - University of Wales Press 2004
 Pa beth yr aethoch allan i'w achub? - Gwasg Carreg y Gwalch 2013
 Pam Na Fu Cymru: Methiant Cenedlaetholdeb Cymraeg - University of Wales Press 2015. Published in English as Why Wales never was in 2017
 Hanes Cymry - Lleiafrifoedd Ethnig yn y Gwareiddiad Cymraeg (A History of the Welsh - Ethnic Minorities in Welsh-language Civilization) - University of Wales Press 2020.

Journalism
 Llythyrau at Seimon Glyn (ed.) - Y Lolfa 2001
 Yr Hawl i Oroesi (The Right to Exist) - Gwasg Carreg Gwalch 2009

Autoethnography
 Adra - Y Lolfa 2018

References 

Welsh editors
Living people
1971 births